The Victor Railroad Depot is a two-story building located in Victor, Idaho which was listed on the National Register of Historic Places in 1995.

It was built originally with its first floor providing a large freight room, a baggage room, and a ticket office, and with its second floor providing crew layover quarters. It was expanded to the south in 1928 to add a large waiting room, dressing rooms, and restrooms. It served as a combination freight and passenger station.

See also
 List of National Historic Landmarks in Idaho
 National Register of Historic Places listings in Teton County, Idaho

References

1913 establishments in Idaho
Buildings and structures in Teton County, Idaho
Former railway stations in Idaho
National Register of Historic Places in Teton County, Idaho
Railway stations in the United States opened in 1913
Railway stations on the National Register of Historic Places in Idaho